Adolfus mathewsensis is a species of lizard endemic to Kenya.

References

Adolfus
Lacertid lizards of Africa
Reptiles of Kenya
Endemic fauna of Kenya
Reptiles described in 2018
Taxa named by Eli Greenbaum
Taxa named by Stephanie Dowell Beer
Taxa named by Daniel F. Hughes
Taxa named by Philipp Wagner
Taxa named by Christopher G. Anderson
Taxa named by Cesar O. Villanueva
Taxa named by Patrick K. Malonza
Taxa named by Chifundera Kusamba
Taxa named by Wandege M. Muninga
Taxa named by Mwenebatu M. Aristote
Taxa named by William Roy Branch